The Crimean Federal District census , transliterated as Perepis naseleniya v Krymskom federalnom okruge, was carried out in Crimea by Russia in 2014, following its occupation and claimed annexation by Russia. The census found the total population to be 2,284,769 inhabitants.

References

Crimean Federal District
Censuses in Russia
Crimea